The Master Cracksman is a 1914 American drama film featuring Harry Carey.

Background
The film was the first production of the Progressive Motion Picture Corporation, and was based on a story and play.  It was written, directed, and produced by Harry Carey.  The film was reissued in 1915 as The Martin Mystery and in 1920 as The Square Shooter.

As of December 2016, the U.S. Library of Congress has listed the film as lost.

Cast
 Harry Carey as Gentleman Joe, the Cracksman
 E.A. Lock as The Uncle
 Rexford Burnett as Harold Martin
 Fern Foster as Harold's Sister
 Marjorie Bonner as Violet Dane
 Gregory Allen as Office Jim Buckley
 Juliette Day as June Day
 Roland De Castro as Redman Day
 Hayward Mack as District attorney
 Louis Morrell as Robert Kendall
 William H. Power as Nicholas Moses
 Herbert Russell as Capt. Dan McRae

See also
 Harry Carey filmography

References

External links

The Master Cracksman, at afi.com

1914 films
1914 drama films
American silent feature films
American black-and-white films
Films directed by Harry Carey
Silent American drama films
Lost American films
1914 lost films
Lost drama films
1910s American films